Pacific City is an extinct town in Pacific County, in the U.S. state of Washington.

Pacific City was laid out ca. 1848. A post office called Pacific City was established in 1850, and remained in operation until 1865.

References

Ghost towns in Washington (state)
Geography of Pacific County, Washington